The 2006 Speedway Grand Prix was the 61st edition of the official World Championship and the 12th season in the Speedway Grand Prix era used to determine the Speedway World Champion.

Event format 
The format remained the same as 2005 with 16 riders taking part in each Grand Prix and over the course of 20 heats each rider will race against every other rider once.  The top 8 scorers advance to a semi-final and from each semi-final the 1st and 2nd placed riders will advance to the GP final.  All riders apart from the qualifiers for the final carry forward the points earned in the first 20 heats over the course of the season. The riders placing in the final receive points as follows:

 1st place = 25 points
 2nd place = 20 points
 3rd place = 18 points
 4th place = 16 points

Qualification for Grand Prix 

For the 2006 season, there were 15 permanent riders, to be joined at each Grand Prix by one wild card.  The top 8 riders from the 2005 championship qualified as of right.  They were, in 2005 championship order:

  Tony Rickardsson  (retired part way through the season and replaced by  Hans Andersen)
  Jason Crump 
  Leigh Adams
  Nicki Pedersen  
  Greg Hancock  
  Bjarne Pedersen  
  Tomasz Gollob  
  Andreas Jonsson

They were joined by 7 riders named by the organisers of the series, who are: (in alphabetical order)

  Jarosław Hampel 
  Niels Kristian Iversen 
  Antonio Lindback 
  Scott Nicholls 
  Piotr Protasiewicz 
  Lee Richardson 
  Matej Zagar

Calendar 

results: 
Slovenia • 
Europe • 
Sweden • 
Great Britain • 
Danmark • 
Italy • 
Scandinavia • 
Czech Republic • 
Latvia • 
Poland

Final standings

References

External links 
 List of results from Official Speedway GP site

2006
World I